The Kouga mountains are a mountain range on the border of the Eastern Cape and Western Cape provinces in South Africa, stretching in an east–west direction. They are part of the Cape Fold Belt, beginning just east of Uniondale and stretching further eastwards. The range separates the Baviaanskloof (to which the Kouga Mountains run parallel) and Langkloof from each other.

References

Mountain ranges of South Africa